Evil Singing Pandas is an independent metal band and podcast/talk-show program based in Singapore and Bangkok, Thailand. The members consist of Remy Evilpanda on vocals and talk show anchor, Rex Viperon on all instruments and Joey Chin as talk show producer. They have released 2 EPs, 2 Compilation albums and over 14 singles, and hosted over 24 episodes of talk shows.

Notable releases include "We Are The Mighty Eagles", the official anthem of Geylang International football club, "Zombiepura", which features Lance "The King of Black Metal" from Witch Taint, on guest vocals and guitars,"Oathbreaker" a collaboration with Professional boxer Darryl Edmund "Oathbreaker" Kho, and two classic Lunar New Year covers, "拜年 (Bai Nian)" and "恭喜恭喜 (Gong Xi Gong Xi)".

The band disbanded following the release of "We are the Mighty Eagles".

Official Anthem for Geylang International Football Club 
"We Are The Mighty Eagles", the official anthem for Geylang International Football Club, was released on 22 February 2022.  The song will be played at all home matches, before kick-off, half-time and whenever a goal is scored by the Eagles.

The anthem debut on 4 March 2022, during first match of the season when the Eagles earned their first victory, defeating defending champions Lion City Sailors 1-0 at home.

The anthem is also being used in various videos promoting the club, including a behind the scenes pre-season photoshoot and tribute clip to the main sponsor Epson in 2022.

The Official EDM Remix version was released on 20 September 2022.

Classic Lunar New Year Covers 
Evil Singing Pandas release 2 Classic Lunar New Year Covers  "拜年 (Bai Nian)" and "恭喜恭喜 (Gong Xi Gong Xi)".

恭喜恭喜 (Gong Xi Gong Xi) was released in March 2020 in the height of COVID-19 pandemic, as a tribute to all Healthcare workers in Singapore and all over the world.

Collaborations

Collaboration with Witch Taint 
Evil Singing Pandas teamed up with American Band Witch Taint for the track "Zombiepura", featuring Lance "The King of Black Metal" on guest vocals and guest guitars. The song was submitted to the producers of Singaporean Zombie-Movie with the same title, for the consideration as part of their Original Soundtrack. It was not selected eventually, but Evil Singing Pandas released it anyway as a tribute.

Evil Singing Pandas got acquainted with Witch Taint when the track by the American Band "Sons of Satan" was released. Remy Evilpanda reached out to Lance "The King of Black Metal" and became friends after several exchanges of messages. Remy Evilpanda was also invited as a guest for Witch Taint's talk show for various occasions.

Collaboration and partnership with Kohld Haveneson of Laang 
Evil Singing Pandas engaged Kohld Haveneson of Laang, in numerous releases including "Fall of The Giant", "My Engineering Can't Replace Your Blackened Heart (Unplugged Version)", "The girl who works in a coffee shop (Unplugged and Piano Version)", "海边“ and "We Are The Mighty Eagles".

In a guitar-give-away campaign to the fans in June 2020, Kohld participated as a fan by covering "My Engineering Can't Replace Your Blackened Heart (Laang Version)".

Collaboration with Darryl Edmund "Oathbreaker" Kho 
Evil Singing Pandas released "Oathbreaker" on 15 February 2020, in collaboration with Singapore based Professional Super-Middle Weight Boxer, Darryl Edmund "Oathbreaker" Kho. The track is endorsed officially by the boxer for marketing and promotion.

Collaboration with Hiroaki Sato aka Satokin 
The song "Assassination of the Emperor Tuna" a food-themed Thrash Metal song was release on 26 June 2021. The song is collaboration with Hiroaki Sato aka Satokin (ex-Defiled and Abyss).

The concept of the track revolves around tuna sashimi, one of Japan's most beloved cuisines. Hiroaki also incorporated a 900-year-old Japanese haiku into the lyrics. Here is the explanation of Remy Evilpanda: " The song was about Tuna Sashimi, one of Japan's most loved cuisine. To have a Japanese artist appear in a Japanese-Food-related Thrash metal Song, written by songwriters from Singapore and Thailand was a great honor indeed. Just when I thought the honor cannot be higher, Hiroaki San took the trouble to research and found a 900-year-old Japanese Haiku as his lyric for the guest appearance. I am beyond stoked. "

Collaboration with Daniel Vrangsinn 
Evil Singing Pandas collaborated with Daniel Vrangsinn from Carpathian Forest, on the track "WNKCR" launched on 24 October 2020. The song is dedicated to the late founder of Wee Nam Kee Chicken Rice Mr. Wee Toon Ouut.

Talk show: In Conversation with Evil Singing Pandas 
Evil Singing Pandas started a talk show "In Conversation with Evil Singing Pandas" in June 2020. Guests invited include band leaders, guitar virtuoso, record label owners, professional photographers, fashion label owners and models. Notable guests include Nattefrost and Daniel Vrangsinn from Carpathian Forest, Beatallica, Witch Taint, Manheim and Messiah from Mayhem.

Discography

Members

Core members 
 Remy Evilpanda – lead vocals, lyrics, guitars, bass, cover art illustrator
 Rex Viperon – all instruments, arrangements, sound production, engineering, mastering
 Joey Chin – Producer of "In Conversation with Evil Singing Pandas"

Guest Artistes 

 Kohld Haveneson on  "Fall of The Giant", "My Engineering Can't Replace Your Blackened Heart (Unplugged Version)", "The girl who works in a coffee shop (Unplugged and Piano Version)", "海边“ and "We Are The Mighty Eagles".
 Lance "The King of Blackmetal" on "Zombiepura" .
 Daniel Vrangsinn on "WNKCR"
 Hiroaki Sato aka SATOKIN on "Assassination of the Emperor Tuna"

References 
.

Thrash metal musical groups
Singaporean heavy metal musical groups
Thai heavy metal musical groups
Musical groups from Bangkok
Comedy musical groups
Talk show podcasts